Magnolia panamensis is a species of flowering plant in the family Magnoliaceae. It is native to Panama, and its distribution probably extends into Costa Rica. It is a forest tree with few current threats to its populations.

Range and habitat
Magnolia panamensis is native to the Cordillera Central of western Panama, in the provinces Bocas del Toro and Chiriquí, and extending to the Costa Rican border. There is a population in La Amistad National Park. Its range is presumed to extend into the Cordillera de Talamanca of Costa Rica. The species' potential forest distribution is 2,107 km2.

It is found in humid montane forests from 2,000 to 2,600 meters elevation.

The species' population is thought to be stable, and its conservation status is assessed as least concern.

References

panamensis
Flora of Panama
Flora of the Talamancan montane forests
Taxonomy articles created by Polbot